West Calder United Football Club are a Scottish football club based in West Calder, West Lothian. Their home ground is Hermand Park, West Calder. Club colours are red and black.

The SJFA restructured prior to the 2006–07 season, and West Calder found themselves in the 15-team East Region, South Division. They finished 12th in their first season in the division. 

Club staff

Board of directors

Coaching staff

Source

Current squad
As of 31 October 2022

Managerial history

c Caretaker manager

¹

References

External links
Official club website
Facebook
Twitter
old club website

Football clubs in Scotland
Scottish Junior Football Association clubs
Association football clubs established in 1950
Football in West Lothian
1950 establishments in Scotland
East of Scotland Football League teams